The 1992 Houston Oilers season was the team's 33rd season and their 23rd in the National Football League (NFL).

The Oilers reached the playoffs for the 6th consecutive season, which was the longest such streak in the NFL at the time. (They would extend that to seven straight playoff appearances the following season). During their 1992 season, Houston finished the season 10–6, good enough for 2nd place in the AFC Central. However, in the postseason, the Oilers would fall on the losing end of what would become one of the most substantial come from behind victories in NFL history, dropping a 35–3 lead in the Wild Card game against Buffalo to lose by a score of 41–38. As noted, the Buffalo Bills victory in this game was deemed the greatest comeback in NFL history before the Minnesota Vikings' victory over the Indianapolis Colts surpassed it in 2022, and is referred to as "The Comeback" (or by then-Oiler fans, "The Choke").

Offseason

NFL Draft

Personnel

Staff

Roster

Regular season

Schedule

Game Summaries

Week One vs. Steelers
Two Warren Moon touchdowns and a score off a Steelers fumble put the Oilers up 24–16 at halftime, but from there Neil O'Donnell led the Steelers back on three scoring drives and a 29–24 Pittsburgh win.

Week Two at Colts
Warren Moon added two more touchdowns while Jack Trudeau and Tom Tupa couldn't reach 140 passing yards in a 20–10 Oilers win.

Week Three vs. Chiefs
Two years after throwing for 527 yards in a 27–10 win Moon was intercepted twice and held to 279 yards but led the Oilers from down 13–3 to lead in the fourth 20–13.  From there future Oiler Todd McNair tied the game, but Al Del Greco won it 23–20 in overtime on a 39-yard field goal.

Week Four vs. Chargers
Warren Moon threw a touchdown and ran in a second while Stan Humphries was intercepted three times in a 27–0 shutout.  It would be the franchise's final win over the Chargers until 2013.

Bye Week

Week Six at Bengals
The Oilers had won their previous two matchups (both 1991) with the Bengals by a combined score of 65–10 but memory of Cincinnati's 41–14 playoff win in 1990 was still fresh as the Oilers raced to a 24–0 lead, Warren Moon threw five touchdowns, and Houston won 38–24.

Week Seven at Broncos
The Oilers returned to the site of a 26–24 playoff meltdown the previous season.  The game lead changed five times as the Oilers took a 21–20 lead but the Broncos won 27–21.

Week Eight vs. Bengals
Houston authored another season sweep as Moon threw for 342 yards and two scores while Norman Esiason had a touchdown but gave up a safety when he was run out his own end zone.

Week Nine at Steelers
Moon led the Oilers to two field goal drives as the Steelers led 7–6 at halftime.   Moon had to give way to Cody Carlson, who threw a touchdown then saw a fumble-return score and a 20–7 Houston lead.  But from there two Neil O'Donnell touchdowns rallied Pittsburgh to a 21–20 win.

Week Ten vs. Browns
Moon again started and again Carlson came in, this time with the Oilers down 17–0, and his two touchdowns weren't enough in a 24–14 Browns win.

Week Eleven at Vikings
Future Vikings quarterback Moon rallied Houston from down 10–3 on a touchdown to Ernest Givins and a drive ending in a field goal and the 17–13 Houston win.

Week Twelve at Dolphins
The Oilers under Jack Pardee had blown leads with noticeable frequency and it happened again after leading 13–3 in the second quarter.  The Oilers were held scoreless in the fourth in losing 19–16.

Week Thirteen at Lions
With Warren Moon now out with injury until the end of the season Cody Carlson started and the game lead changed five times in the second half. Lorenzo White’s score was the winner in the 24-21 contest.

Week Fourteen vs. Bears
The Oilers reached eight wins 24-7 while the Bears were approaching the end of Mike Ditka’s time as head coach.  The opposing quarterbacks Carlson and Peter Tom Willis combined for just 363 yards passing.

Week Fifteen vs. Packers
Two Cody Carlson interceptions and two Oilers fumbles hurt Houston in a 16-14 loss to the Packers despite holding Green Bay to less than 230 yards.

Week Sixteen at Browns
Carlson rallied the Oilers from down 14-3, overcoming two interceptions to toss two touchdowns and win 17-14.  The Oilers defense picked off Bernie Kosar three times.

Week Seventeen vs. Bills
After a Steve Christie field goal the Bills were crushed by 27 straight Oilers points.  Jim Kelly was knocked out of the game and for Buffalo’s ensuing playoff game.  Cody Carlson had a touchdown then gave way to Warren Moon who had a touchdown and despite completing less than half his passes (6 of 13) had a higher passer rating (91.8 to Carlson’s 73.4); Bills quarterbacks had only a 27 passer rating.

Standings

Playoffs

AFC Wildcard

The Oilers held a 35–3 lead on the Buffalo Bills. Bills backup quarterback Frank Reich led the Bills on a 38–3 run in the second half and overtime against the Oilers defense en route to a 41–38 overtime victory. The game is the largest comeback in NFL history, regular or postseason. Houston, whose 1992 team some believed gave them their best chance to win the Super Bowl, made several sweeping changes in the offseason.

Defensive coordinator Jim Eddy was fired shortly after the game. Oilers cornerback Cris Dishman called it "the biggest choke in history."

According to statistics site Football Outsiders, who does play-by-play analyses of each team each season, the Oilers were the best team in the AFC at the end of the 1992 season. "So if you are a Houston Oilers/Tennessee Titans fan," says the site, "who agonizes over the Frank Reich comeback game blowing your franchise's best shot at a Super Bowl title, well, here's another opportunity to feel sad."

Awards and records
 Warren Moon, AFC Passing Leader (Passer Rating 89.3)

References

External links
 1992 Houston Oilers at Pro-Football-Reference.com

 Week 16: Oilers Beat Clock, Browns : AFC: Houston scores two touchdowns in final three minutes to win at Cleveland, 17-14, Los Angeles Times (Associated Press), Dec. 21, 1992.

Houston Oilers
Houston Oilers seasons
Houston